Carfax may refer to:

Places
 Carfax, Oxford, England
Carfax Conduit, a water conduit that supplied Oxford from 1617 until the 19th century
 Carfax College, an independent school in Oxford
 Carfax, the centre of Horsham, West Sussex, England

NASCAR racing
 Carfax 250, now Irish Hills 250
 Carfax 400, now Pure Michigan 400

Other uses
 Carfax (company), a commercial web-based service that supplies vehicle history reports
 Carfax Gallery (or Carfax & Co) in London, co-founded by William Rothenstein
 Carfax, or Carfax Abbey, fictional home in England of Count Dracula
 Carfax, A fictional town in Virginia and home of the narrator in The Rats in the Walls
Carfax, a project of artist/musician Mikey Georgeson
Carfax, leading character in Other People's Sins, a 1931 British crime film

See also
 "The Disappearance of Lady Frances Carfax", a Sherlock Holmes story by Sir Arthur Conan Doyle
 The Clever Mrs. Carfax'', a 1917 American comedy silent film